The Government of Meghalaya also known as the State Government of Meghalaya, is the supreme governing authority of the Indian state of Meghalaya and its 11 districts. It consists of an executive, led by the Governor of Meghalaya, a judiciary and a legislative branch.

Like other states in India, the head of state of Meghalaya is the Governor, appointed by the President of India on the advice of the Union Government. His or her post is largely ceremonial. The Chief Minister is the head of government and is vested with most of the executive powers. Shillong is the capital of Meghalaya, and houses the Vidhan Sabha (Legislative Assembly) and the Secretariat. The Meghalaya High Court, located in Shillong, Meghalaya, exercises the jurisdiction and powers in respect of cases arising in the State of Meghalaya.

The present Meghalaya Legislative Assembly is unicameral, consisting of 60 Member of the Legislative Assembly (M.L.A). Its term is 5 years, unless sooner dissolved.

Political situation of meghalya

 Government and politics in Meghalaya, by R. S. Lyngdoh. Sanchar Pub. House, 1996. .

External links